The Qatar national under-20 football team is the national youth team of Qatar and is controlled by the Qatar Football Association. Qatar's U-20 national team played an important role in the development of football in Qatar and gave it one its first shining moment on the global stage when the youth squad finished second in the 1981 FIFA World Youth Championship in Australia.

History

Formation
In response to the recently established World Youth Championship, Qatar established its national youth team in 1976. However, they were unable to qualify for the first two World Youth Championships in 1977 in Tunisia and in 1979 in Japan.

1981 World Youth Championship
In the 1980 AFC Youth Championship which were held in Thailand, Qatar U20s finished as runners-up after losing to South Korea in the final. This granted them a spot in the 1981 FIFA World Youth Championship, which was hosted in Australia. Under the supervision of Brazilian coach Evaristo de Macedo, the championships proved to be a success. Facing Brazil in the quarter-finals, they were able to secure a 3–2 victory by utilizing the offside trap. They went on to face England in the semi-finals, where they earned a 2–1 victory after a fine performance by their goalkeeper.

The team finished second after losing 0–4 to West Germany in the final on a wet pitch which was unfavorable to the Qataris as they were not used to playing in such conditions. As a result of achieving runners-up position, each Qatari player received 100,000 Qatari riyals, a Mercedes Benz, and a bungalow. The population of Qataris was only 120,000 at the time of this achievement.

1995 World Youth Championship
Qatar earned its second international U-20 World Cup appearance in 1995 as hosts. While Nigeria was preparing to host the 1995 edition, an Ebola epidemic broke out in west Africa, and as a result, FIFA decided to award the hosting rights to Qatar with only twenty days remaining till the start of the championships.

2014 AFC U-19 Championship
Qatar's youth team won the AFC U-19 Championship for the first time in its history after defeating DPR Korea 1–0 in the final of the 2014 edition which took place in Myanmar. Advancing undefeated from a group which included DPR Korea and Iraq, they defeated China 4–2 in the quarter-finals, and earned a 3–2 victory after extra time against the hosts in the semi-finals. In the finals, the Qataris would be victorious against DPR Korea for a second time in the tournament, with super sub Akram Afif scoring the only goal of the match in the second half. The entire squad was composed of Aspire Academy students. As a result of Aspire's HOPE Project (Holistic Overseas Player Experience), most of the squad were European-based.

Competitive record

AFC U-19 Championship record

FIFA U-20 World Cup 

 Red border color indicates tournament was held on home soil.

Results and fixtures

2023

Managerial history

 Evaristo de Macedo (xx)
 José Faria (1979)
 Evaristo de Macedo (xx)
 João Francisco (1986)
 Edison de Souza (1987)
 Celso Roth (1991–92)
 Marcio Maximo (1994)
 Jørgen E. Larsen (1995)
 Alejandro Sabella (1995)
 José Paulo (1995–97)
 Marcelo Buarque (1997)
 José Paulo (1998)
 Obeid Jumaa (1998)
 Ruud Doctor (2001–03)
 Tiny Ruys (xx–2005)
 Roberto Landi (2005–06)
 Remco Boere (2007)
 Tiny Ruys (xx–2011)
 Marcel van Buuren (2011–2013)
 Félix Sánchez (2013–2020)

References

External links
QFA - U-20

See also
Qatar national football team
Qatar national under-17 football team
Football in Qatar
AFC Youth Championship

National youth sports teams of Qatar
Asian national under-20 association football teams